1-Nonanol is a straight chain fatty alcohol with nine carbon atoms and the molecular formula CH3(CH2)8OH.  It is a colorless oily liquid with a citrus odor similar to citronella oil.

Nonanol occurs naturally in orange oil. The primary use of nonanol is in the manufacture of artificial lemon oil.  Various esters of nonanol, such as nonyl acetate, are used in perfumery and flavors.

Toxicity

1-Nonanol shares similar toxicological properties to those of other primary alcohols. It is poorly absorbed through the skin and is severely irritating to the eyes. Vapors can be damaging to the lungs, causing pulmonary edema in severe cases. Oral exposure results in symptoms similar to those of ethanol intoxication, and like ethanol consumption, can cause liver damage.

References

Fatty alcohols
Primary alcohols
Nonanols